

Events and publications

Year overall 

 In The Daily Orange, the Syracuse University students' newspaper, the initial story of Vaugh Bode’s Cheech Wizard, Race to the Moon, appears.
 In Milan, Renzo Barbieri and Giorgio Cavedon, after the bankruptcy of their Editrice 66, set up another publishing house specialized in erotic comics, ErreGi. The new label immediately gets a great public success.
 On Almanacco dei comics, the catalog of the Lucca International Comics Fair, the first Italian graphic novel, La rivolta dei racchi (The riot of the ugly people) by Guido Buzzelli, is published.

January
 January 11: The final issue of the Flemish children's magazine Pum-Pum is published.
 January 17: Greg and William Vance's Bruno Brazil makes its debut.
 January 17: Greg and Eddy Paape's Luc Orient makes its debut.
 January 20: The Rolling Stones release their album Between the Buttons. On the back cover, a comic strip drawn by drummer Charlie Watts can be seen.
 January 21: The first issue of the British comics magazine Pow! is published. It will run until 13 January 1968. 
 January 21: The first issue of the British girls' comics magazine Mandy is published. It will run until 1991. 
 Blackhawk #228, the beginning of "the New Blackhawk Era" — in the issues that follow, all characters but team leader Blackhawk gain a costumed superhero alter-ego at the behest of a shadowy government agency. (DC Comics)
 Detective Comics #359, "The Million Dollar Debut of Batgirl," written by Gardner Fox and illustrated by Carmine Infantino. (DC Comics)--first appearance of Batgirl
 "The Death of Ferro Lad" story arc begins in Adventure Comics #352, by Jim Shooter, Curt Swan, and George Klein (continued in Adventure Comics #353). (DC Comics)--first appearance of the Fatal Five
 Fightin' 5 #41—last issue, canceled by Charlton.

February 
 February 18: The first issue of the British comics magazine Fantastic is published. It will run until February 1968. 
 February 25: The first issue of the British girls' comics magazine Tina is published, but will be cancelled in September, when it merges with Princess to become Princess Tina.
 Ghost Rider #1 published 
 Warfront #39 (1951 series) the final issue,  canceled by Harvey Comics.
 Thor #137:  Ulik debuts. 
 Spyman is cancelled.
In Walt Disney’s comics and stories, The red wasp mystery, by Cecil Beard and Paul Murry, debut of Red Wasp, the Mouseton's superhero..

March
 "The Adult Legion" story arc begins in Adventure Comics #354, by Jim Shooter, Curt Swan, and George Klein (Concludes next issue) (DC Comics)
 The character Peacemaker, who debuted in November 1966, now receives his own series. 
 The final issues of Dracula and Frankenstein are published by Dell Comics.
In Donald Duck, A whale of an adventure, by Vic Lockman and Tony Strobl; debut of Moby Duck.

April
 April 1: David Sutherland's Billy the Cat and Katie makes its debut in The Beano. It will run until 1971. 
 April 4: In Peanuts the yellow bird Woodstock makes its debut, but he will only receive his name on 22 June 1970.
 April 14: Sezgin Burak's Tarkan debuts in the daily pages of Hürriyet.
 April 15: The first issue of the British comics magazine Terrific is published. It will run until 3 February 1968. 
 C.C. Beck and Otto Binder's Fatman the Human Flying Saucer makes his debut.

May
 May 1: In an issue of the American satirical magazine The Realist Wally Wood creates the Disneyland Memorial Orgy, a highly subversive deconstruction of familiar Disney characters to commemorate Walt Disney's passing at the end of 1966.
 May 5: Robert Crumb's character Mr. Natural makes his first appearance in the first issue of the underground newspaper Yarrowstalks.
 May 25: The final episode of David Wright and Peter Meriton's Carol Day is published. 
 May 28: The first episode of Captain Kate by Jerry and Hally Skelly is published. It will run until 21 May 1972.
 The first issue of The Many Ghosts of Doctor Graves is published. It will run until January 1986.
In Almanacco Topolino, Paperone e l’angolare di sicurezza, by Rodolfo Cimino and Massimo De Vita; debut of Battista, the Uncle Scrooge’s butler.

June
 June 10: The first issue of the Dutch girls comics magazine Tina is published.
 June 19: Jimmy Hughes' Bully Beef and Chips makes its debut. 
 Blue Beetle #1 (vol. 5) (Charlton)--first appearance of The Question
 The first issue of the Italian comics magazine Storia del West is published and will run until December 1980.

July
 July 1: The final episode of Roland J. Scott's long-running newspaper comic series Sally's Sallies and Scott's Scrapbook, which respectively ran since 1926 and 1931, is published.
 July 8: The final episode of Philip Francis Nowlan's Buck Rogers newspaper comic is published.
 July 28: Violet Moore Higgins, American illustrator and comic artist (Drowsy Dick), dies at age 80.
 The first issue of the German comics magazine Bussi Bär is published by Rolf Kauka's comics company.
 The first issue of the Italian comics magazine Sergeant Kirk is published. In it Héctor Germán Oesterheld and Hugo Pratt's Corto Maltese makes its debut.
 Our Army at War #182: Artist Neal Adams makes his DC Comics debut with the short story "It's My Turn to Die".
 Strange Adventures, with issue #202, changes format from science fiction to supernatural fantasy. (DC Comics)
The Amazing Spider-Man #50' "Spider-Man No More!," written by Stan Lee and illustrated by John Romita, Sr. (Marvel Comics)
 Robert Crumb's Snoid makes his debut in the second issue of Yarrowstalks.

August
 The Adventures of Jerry Lewis #101: "Jerry the Asto-Nut", Neal Adams' first full-length story for DC.
 Superman #199 Writer Jim Shooter and artist Curt Swan crafted the story "Superman's Race With the Flash!"  which featured the first race between the Flash and Superman, two characters known for their super-speed powers.
 Closure of the longtime publisher American Comics Group, and the cancellation of their long-running titles Adventures into the Unknown (174 issues), Forbidden Worlds (145 issues), and Unknown Worlds (57 issues).
 In the third issue of the underground newspaper Yarrowstalks Robert Crumb's character Flakey Foont makes his debut.
 The first issue of Not Brand Echh is published. It will run until May 1969. 
 The final episode of Osamu Tezuka's Ambassador Magma is published.
In Huey, Dewey and Louie Junior Woodchucks, Rescue of the Grand Mogul, by Vic Lockman and Tony Strobl; debut of the Gran Mogul.

September
 September 11: The first episode of Gordon Bess' Redeye is published.
 September 23: The British comics magazines Princess and Tina merge into Princess Tina. It will exist in this form until 1973.

October
 October 1: The first episode of the TV adaptation of Jean Dulieu's Paulus the woodgnome is published, the first TV adaptation of a Dutch comic strip. 
 October 11: Hans P. Frankfurther establishes the Dutch comics appreciation society Het Stripschap, the oldest and longest-running of its kind in the Netherlands.
 Strange Adventures #205 (DC Comics): first appearance of Deadman, and the first known depiction of narcotics in a story approved by the Comics Code Authority.
 Strange Suspense Stories is relaunched for the fourth and final time. It will run until September 1969. 
 The final episode of EsseGesse's Captain Miki is published.

November
 November 9: Pierre Christin and Jean-Claude Mézières's Valérian et Laureline makes its debut in Pilote.
 Ghost Rider, with issue #7, canceled by Marvel.
 Thunderbolt, with issue #60, canceled by Charlton.
 Peacemaker, with issue #5, canceled by Charlton.

December
 December 16: The first episode of Gordon Bell's Pup Parade is published in The Beano. 
 Judomaster, with issue #98, canceled by Charlton.
 Captain Atom, with issue #89, canceled by Charlton.
 King Comics, with issue #11, publishes its final issue of Flash Gordon.

Specific date unknown
 In Toronto, Canada, George Henderson aka Captain George, opens the first Canadian comics store Memory Lane, which is also one of the oldest in the world at that time. The store will remain in business until the 1980s.
 Bill Tidy's The Cloggies debuts in the satirical magazine Private Eye.
 Don Martin's Captain Klutz debuts in one of Mad Magazine's paperbacks. 
 Vaughn Bodé's Cheech Wizard makes his debut.
 Robin Wood and Lucho Olivera 's Nippur de Lagash makes its debut. 
 The first issue of Gordon Johnston's It Happened in Canada is published.
 The final episode of Jerry Robinson's True Classroom Flubs and Fluffs is published.   
 The final episode of Robert Renzi and Augusto Pedrazza's Akim is published.
 The final episode of Alfred Mazure's Dick Bos is published.
 Kinney National Company acquires National Periodical Publications (a.k.a. DC Comics).
 A tumultuous year for Charlton Comics, as they debut titles like Blue Beetle (vol. 5), The Many Ghosts of Doctor Graves, Peacemaker, and Timmy the Timid Ghost; but are forced to cancel Fightin' 5, Thunderbolt, the afore-mentioned Peacemaker, Judomaster, and Captain Atom.
 The newspaper strip Captain Kate begins syndication.
 George Perry and Alan Aldridge's The Penguin Book of Comics is published, the first British reference guide about comics. It will receive a revised edition in 1971.
 Roberto Altomann publishes Geste Hypergraphique, a comic book with abstract imagery, a surreal plot and symbols and freeform interpunction.
 Ralph Dunagin's Dunagin's People makes its debut. It will run until 2001.
 Jean-Pol and Jacques van Melkebeke create Bi-Bip for Het Laatste Nieuws. The comic strip will have an unexpected international success and run until 1969.
 Belgian novelist Hugo Claus and cartoonist hugOKÉ make a satirical comic book, Belgman.
 In India, Anant Pai establishes the historical-educational comic book series Amar Chitra Katha.

Births

February
 February 20: Kurt Cobain, American rock singer and guitarist (made some comics in his diaries, which were posthumously released), (d. 1994).

Deaths

January
 January 21: Homer Fleming, American cartoonist and comics artist (Craig Kennedy), dies at age 84.

March
 March 19: Gil Turner, American animator, comics artist and film producer (Looney Tunes comics, Hanna-Barbera comics, Disney comics), dies at age 54.
 March 20: Anders Bjørgaard, Norwegian illustrator and comics artist (Jens von Bustenskjold), dies at age 76.

April
 April 28: Jack Romer, American comics artist (TV Titters, Bobo & Binky), passes away at age 69.

May
 May 9: Wallace Carlson, American animator and comics artist (The Nebbs), dies at age 73.
 May 25: David Wright, British illustrator and comics artist (Carol Day), passes away at age 64.

June
 June 7: Willy Lateste, Belgian animator and comics artist (historical comics for Ons Volkske), dies at age 36. 
 June 21: Stan Kaye, American comics artist (Hayfoot Henry, continued Superman, Batman), dies at age 50.
 June 27: Charles A. Winter, aka Chuck Winter, American comics artist (Liberty Belle), dies at age 80.

July
 July 4: Ondřej Sekora, Czech journalist, painter, writer, illustrator and comics artist (Ferda Mravenec, aka Ferda the ant), passes away at age 67.

August
 August 26: Marian Walentynowicz, Polish architect, illustrator and comics artist (Koziolek Matolek, Malpka Fiki Miki), passes away at the age of 81.

September
 September 4: Margit Uppenberg, aka Gobi, Swedish comics artist and illustrator (Pian), dies at age 60.
 September 28: Romà Bonet Sintes, AKA Bon, Spanish caricaturist and comic artist, dies at age 81.

October
 October 1: Bob Powell, American comics artist (co-creator of Blackhawk, continued Sheena, Queen of the Jungle and Mr. Mystic), dies at age 51.

December
 December 12: Mac Raboy, American comics artist (continued Captain Marvel, Jr., Green Lama and Flash Gordon), dies at age 53.

Specific date unknown
 Jean Bellus, French comics artist (Georgie, Laurel et Hardy), passes away at age 55 or 56.
 Jean Dratz, Belgian painter, caricaturist and comics artist (Petit Chéri), dies at age 61 or 62.
 Li Fan-fu, Chinese comics artist (Young Master, Old Master Ho), dies at age 60 or 61.
 Branko Vidić, Serbian novelist and comics writer (Zigomar), passes away at age 62 or 63.

Exhibitions 
 April 7–June 12: Bande dessinée et figuration narrative, Musée des Arts Décoratifs, Paris.

Conventions
 June 16–18: Houston Comic Convention (Southwesterncon II) (Ramada Inn, Houston, Texas) — first Houston-based comics convention; 124 attendees.
 June 17–18: Detroit Triple Fan Fair (Park Shelton Hotel, Detroit, Michigan) — co-produced by Shel Dorf and Hal Shapiro; Guest of Honor: Roger Zelazny; presentation of the first Nova Award
 July 14–16: Academy Con (City Squire Inn, New York City) — 3rd edition of this convention; attendees include Frank Frazetta, Roy Krenkel, and Stephen Hickman.
 July 29–31: Gateway Con (St. Louis, Missouri) — produced by Bob Schoenfeld and the Gateway Comic Art Fan Club of St. Louis; guests include Reed Crandall, Ted White, Steve Gerber, and Al Capp. Films shown include the complete 12-chapter serial Adventures of Captain Marvel (1941).

Awards

Alley Awards
Best Comic Magazine Section 
Adventure Book with the Main Character in the Title - The Amazing Spider-Man  (Marvel Comics)
Adventure Hero Title with One or More Characters in Own Strip - Strange Tales  (Marvel Comics)
Super Hero Group Title - Fantastic Four  (Marvel Comics)
Non-Super-Powered Group Title - Challengers of the Unknown  (DC Comics)
Fantasy/SF/Supernatural Title - The Many Ghosts of Doctor Graves  (Charlton Comics)
Western Title - Ghost Rider  (Marvel Comics)
War Title - Sgt. Fury and his Howling Commandos  (Marvel Comics)
Humor Title: Teenage - Archie  (Archie Comics)
Humor Title: Costumed - Not Brand Echh  (Marvel Comics)
Humor Title: Juvenile - Uncle Scrooge  (Western Publishing)
All-Reprint Title - Fantasy Masterpieces  (Marvel Comics)
Combination New & Reprint Material Title - Marvel Super-Heroes  (Marvel Comics)

Best Professional Work 
Editor - Stan Lee  (Marvel Comics)
Writer - Stan Lee
Pencil Artist - Jack Kirby
Inking Artist - Joe Sinnott
Cover - Strange Adventures #207, by Neal Adams  (DC Comics)
Coloring - Magnus, Robot Fighter  (Gold Key Comics)
Full-Length Story - "Who's Been Lying in My Grave?", by Arnold Drake & Carmine Infantino, Strange Adventures #205  (DC Comics)
Feature Story - "Lost Continent of Mongo" by Archie Goodwin and Al Williamson, Flash Gordon #4  (King Comics)
Regular Short Feature - (tie) "Tales of Asgard" and "Tales of the Inhumans", both by Stan Lee & Jack Kirby, in The Mighty Thor   (Marvel Comics)
Hall of Fame - The Spirit, by Will Eisner

Popularity Poll 
Best Costumed or Powered Hero - Spider-Man  (Marvel Comics)
Best Normal Adventure Hero - Nick Fury, Agent of S.H.I.E.L.D.  (Marvel Comics)
Best Super-Powered Group - Fantastic Four  (Marvel Comics)
Best Normal Adventure Group - Challengers of the Unknown  (DC Comics)
Best Male Normal Supporting Character - J. Jonah Jameson (The Amazing Spider-Man)  (Marvel Comics)
Best Female Normal Supporting Character - Mary Jane Watson (The Amazing Spider-Man)  (Marvel Comics)
Best Villain - Doctor Doom (Fantastic Four)  (Marvel Comics)
Best New Strip - "Deadman", by Arnold Drake & Carmine Infantino, in Strange Adventures   (DC Comics)
Best Revived Strip - Blue Beetle  (Charlton Comics)
Strip Most Needing Improvement - Batman  (DC Comics)
Strip Most Desired for Revival - Adam Strange  (DC Comics)

Newspaper Strip Section 
Best Adventure Strip - Prince Valiant, by Hal Foster
Best Human Interest Strip - On Stage, by Leonard Starr
Best Humor Strip - Peanuts, by Charles Schulz
Best Humor Panel - Dennis the Menace, by Hank Ketcham
Best Miscellaneous Strip - Ripley's Believe It or Not
Hall of Fame Award - Flash Gordon, by Alex Raymond

Fan Activity Section 
Best All-Article Fanzine - (tie) Batmania and Gosh Wow
Best All-Strip Fanzine - Star-Studded Comics
Best All-Fiction Fanzine - Stories of Suspense
Best Article/Strip Fanzine - Fantasy Illustrated
Best Fiction/Strip Fanzine - Star-Studded Comics
Best Article/Fiction Fanzine - (tie) Gosh Wow and Huh!
Best Fannish One-Shot - Fandom Annual
Best Article on Comic Book Material - "Blue Bolt and Gang" (Gosh Wow #1)
Best Article on Comic Strip Material - "Gully Foyle" (Star-Studded Comics #11)
Best Regular Fan Column - "What's News", by Dave Kaler
Best Fan Fiction - "Nightwalker", by Larry Brody (Gosh Wow #1)
Best Fan Comic Strip - "Xal-Kor", by Richard "Grass" Green
Best Fan Artist - George Metzger
Best Comic Strip Writer - Larry Herndon
Best Fan Project - 1967 South-Western Con
Best Newsletter - On the Drawing Board, by Bob Schoenfeld

First issues by title

Marvel Comics 
America's Best TV Comics
Release: mid-year. Writer: Stan Lee. Artists: Jack Kirby, Paul Reinman, Dick Ayers, John Romita Sr.

Ghost Rider
 Release: February. Writers: Gary Friedrich and Roy Thomas. Artists: Dick Ayers and Vince Colletta.

Not Brand Echh
 Release: August. Editor: Stan Lee.

Charlton Comics 
Blue Beetle (vol. 5)
 Release: June by Charlton Comics. Writer/Artist: Steve Ditko.

The Many Ghosts of Doctor Graves
 Release: May by Charlton Comics. Editor: Dick Giordano.

Peacemaker
 Release: March by Charlton Comics. Writer: Joe Gill. Artist: Pat Boyette.

Timmy the Timid Ghost vol. 2
 Release: October by Charlton Comics. Editor: Pat Masulli.

Other publishers 
Valérian and Laureline, in Pilote magazine
 Release: November by Dargaud. Writer: Pierre Christin. Artist: Jean-Claude Mézières.

Wonder Wart-Hog
 Release: Millar Publishing Company. Writer: Gilbert Shelton and Tony Bell. Artist: Gilbert Shelton.

Initial appearances by character name

Charlton Comics 
Captain Willy Schultz, in Fightin' Army #76 (October)
The Iron Corporal, in Army War Heroes #22 (November)
Prankster, in Thunderbolt #60 (October/November)
The Question, in Blue Beetle #01 (June)
Banshee, in Blue Beetle #02 (August)
Madmen, in Blue Beetle #03
Punch and Jewelee, in Captain Atom #85 (March)

DC Comics 
Aquagirl in Aquaman #33 (May)
Awesome Threesome, in Aquaman #36 (November)
B'wana Beast in Showcase #66 (February)
Beauty Blaze, in Adventure Comics#355 #355 (April)
Black Manta in Aquaman #35 (August)
Deadman, in Strange Adventures #205 (October)
Ekron
Element Girl in Metamorpho #10 (February)
Fatal Five, in Adventure Comics  #352 (January)
Emerald Empress in Adventure Comics #352 (January)
Mano in Adventure Comics #352 (January)
Persuader in Adventure Comics #352 (January)
Tharok in Adventure Comics #352 (January)
Validus in Adventure Comics #352 (January)
Barbara Gordon, in Detective Comics #359 (January)
Lion-Mane in Hawkman #20 (June)
Mad Mod, in Teen Titans #7 (DC Comics)
Nuidis Vulko, in Brave and the Bold #73 (September)
One Man Meltdown, in  Batman #195 (September)
Rama Kushna in Strange Adventures #205 (October)
Reflecto, in Adventure Comics #354 (March)

Marvel Comics 
 Abomination
 Banshee, in X-Men #28 (January)
 Black Knight (Dane Whitman)
 Blastaar
 Captain Marvel (Mar-Vell)
 Cobalt Man
 Crusher
 Valentina Allegra de Fontaine
 Dreadnought
 Grotesk
 Growing Man
 Kingpin
 Leap-Frog
 Live Wire
 Living Diamond
 Living Tribunal
 Lurking Unknown
 MODOK
 Mogul of the Mystic Mountain
 Ogre
 Phantom Rider
 Psycho-Man
 Clay Quartermain
 Robbie Robertson
 Ronan the Accuser
 Scorpio
 Sentry
 Shocker
 Kevin Sydney
 Tarantula
 Ulik
 Zom

Comic strips 
 Cheech Wizard in college newspapers around Syracuse University
 Mr. Natural in Yarrowstalks #1 (June 5)
 Woodstock in Peanuts (April 4)

References